A roll-on/roll-off discharge facility (RRDF) is a floating platform that provides a roadway between a ship's ramp and lighterage. It is constructed by connecting multiple causeway sections.

Ports equipped with roll-on/roll-off wharfs include:

See also 
 Roll-on/roll-off

Sources 
 Titan International Shipping/Roll-on Roll-off Wharfs
 Roll-on Roll-off

Port infrastructure
Maritime transport